Shiyue Weicheng may refer to:

Bodyguards and Assassins, a 2009 Hong Kong film
The Stand-In (TV series), a 2014 Chinese TV series